Formosa Airlines Flight 7601 was an aviation accident that killed 16 people on 10 August 1997 in Beigan, Matsu Islands, Fujian, Republic of China.

Accident
Formosa Airlines Flight 7601, a Dornier 228 took off from Taipei Sungshan Airport at 07:37 local time with 14 passengers and two pilots on board for a flight to Matsu Beigan Airport. Rain and high winds caused the plane to miss its first approach to Matsu Beigan Airport.  During its go around, the pilot turned right instead of left. The aircraft crashed and caught fire after it struck a military water tower approximately one kilometer from the airport. All 16 passengers and crew on board were killed.

Shortly after the crash, a local weather official tried to commit suicide. The Director of the Civil Aeronautics Administration, Tsai Tui, said the suicide attempt stemmed from public outcry over the crash.

References

External links


Aviation accidents and incidents in 1997
Aviation accidents and incidents in Taiwan
Accidents and incidents involving the Dornier 228
Airliner accidents and incidents caused by pilot error
Airliner accidents and incidents caused by weather
1997 in Taiwan
August 1997 events in Asia
1997 meteorology
1997 disasters in Taiwan